Edmund Estephane (born 16 November 1968) is a Saint Lucian politician who represented the constituency of  Dennery South for the United Workers Party. He is also a former sprinter who competed at World Championships level.

Estephane won his seat at the general election held on 11 December 2006. In the government of Prime Minister John Compton, sworn in on 19 December 2006, Estephane was named Minister in the Ministry of Trade, Industry and Commerce. In early June 2007 he became Minister of Health, and in the next cabinet reshuffle on September 12, 2007, following Compton's death, he became Minister for Labour, Information and Broadcasting. Edmund Estaphane lost his palimentary seat to Saint Lucia Labour Party candidate Alfred Prospere in the 2021 Saint Lucia General Election.

References

1968 births
Living people
Members of the House of Assembly of Saint Lucia
Government ministers of Saint Lucia
United Workers Party (Saint Lucia) politicians
Saint Lucian male sprinters
World Athletics Championships athletes for Saint Lucia